The 1934–35 Scottish Second Division was won by Third Lanark who, along with second placed Arbroath, were promoted to the First Division. Edinburgh City finished bottom.

Table

References

External links
 Scottish Football Archive

Scottish Division Two seasons
2
Scot